"With Every Heartbeat" is a 1989 single by the British pop group Five Star. It was their last single for RCA, the label they signed with in 1983. It reached #49 on the UK charts.

The song never appeared on a studio album, but was included on the group's Greatest Hits album, released later in 1989.

Track listing
7" single and 7" gatefold
 With Every Heartbeat (7")
 Sound Sweet

Cassette single
 With Every Heartbeat (7") 
 Let Me Be Yours (12" Mix)  
 The Five Star Hit Mix, 11:52 (Disco Mix Club megamix featuring Can't Wait Another Minute, Let Me Be The One, All Fall Down, Whenever You're Ready, Find the Time, If I Say Yes, R.S.V.P., Love Take Over, The Slightest Touch)

12" single
 With Every Heartbeat (12" Mix) 
 Sound Sweet 
 Let Me Be Yours (12" Mix / Remix)

CD single
 With Every Heartbeat (7")   
 Let Me Be Yours (12" Mix / Remix) 
 Sound Sweet
 With Every Heartbeat (Dub)

All tracks available on the remastered versions of either the 2012 'Rock The World' album, the 2013 'The Remix Anthology (The Remixes 1984–1991)' or the 2018 'Luxury – The Definitive Anthology 1984-1991' boxset.

Five Star songs
1989 singles
1989 songs
RCA Records singles
Songs written by Wayne Brathwaite